Malaysia curbs blasphemy and any insult to religion or to the religious by rigorous control of what people in that country can say or do. Government-funded schools teach young Muslims the principles of Sunni Islam, and instruct young non-Muslims on morals. The government informs the citizenry on proper behavior and attitudes, and ensures that Muslim civil servants take courses in Sunni Islam. The government ensures that the broadcasting and publishing media do not create disharmony or disobedience. If someone blasphemes or otherwise engages in deviant behavior, Malaysia punishes such transgression with Sharia or through legislation such as the Penal Code.

Penal Code
Articles 295-298A of the Malaysian Penal Code provide penalties for those who commit offenses against religion. The penalties range from  up to three years in prison or a fine of up to US$1,000 (approximately).
Prosecutions for blasphemy usually target those who offend Islam, but an insult to any religion can give rise to prosecution.

The judicial system
The Malaysian Federation's judicial system is based upon English law.
The system has two types of courts. Secular courts deal with civil and criminal law. Sharia courts deal with matters that involve Islamic law: marriage, inheritance, apostasy, religious conversion, and custody among others. Malaysia's judicial system has a Federal Court, a Court of Appeal, High Courts (secular and Sharia in some states), Sessions Courts, Magistrate's Courts, and Juvenile Courts. The Federal Court reviews decisions referred from the Court of Appeal, and the Federal Court has original jurisdiction in constitutional matters and in disputes between states or between the federal government and a state.

In May 2007, the Federal Court ruled that Muslims are not entitled to freedom of worship, even though such freedom is guaranteed by Malaysia's Constitution. By a two-to-one decision, the Court held that the secular courts have no jurisdiction over any Islamic matter even if non-Muslims are involved. In July 2007, the Federal Court ruled that a Sharia court has jurisdiction over any matter that involves non-Muslims only if a state legislature gives the Sharia court such jurisdiction. The Federal Court's decisions have for context the Constitution's Article 121(A), which states that any issue which falls under the jurisdiction of a Sharia court cannot be overruled by a secular high court. The Court's decisions have also for context the Constitution's Article 3, which states that Islam is the religion of the Federation.

The Government maintains an official list of fifty-six sects of Islam which the government considers "deviant" and a threat to national security. Muslims who deviate from accepted Sunni principles may be detained and subjected to mandatory "rehabilitation" in centers that teach and enforce government-approved Islamic practices. Muslims generally may not convert to another religion, although members of other religions may convert to Islam.

Malaysia requires every citizen (from age twelve) to be issued with a national identity card, the MyKad. This card has a microchip which contains, among other information, the name of the cardholder’s religion. All Malays (an ethnic group comprising more than fifty percent of the population)—of whatever religion—have cards with the word "ISLAM" on the card's face. The identity cards enable "religious police" to identify Muslims who are violating Islamic precepts.

Education
Government-sponsored schools require Muslim children to receive Islamic religious instruction. The schools require non-Muslim children to take morals or ethics courses. Student assemblies frequently commence with recitation of a Muslim prayer. The Government requires all Muslim civil servants to attend government-approved religion classes.

The media
The government strictly controls what is broadcast and published. The Printing Press and Publications Act 1984 prohibits the publication of articles or pictures that could disturb public security, harmony, or morality. The printing, sale, distribution, or possession of any banned book is punishable by up to three years imprisonment and/or a fine of 20,000 ringgits. In 2008, the government banned sixty-two books that touched upon religion. In 2008, customs authorities seized six titles of Christian children's books because the books contain words that—according to Islamic authorities—belong to Islam. The Publications and Al-Quran Texts Control Department contended that "Allah" (God), "Baitullah" (House of God), and "Solat" (prayer) are lawfully used by Muslims only.

Selected cases
In August 2009, a state court sentenced a Muslim woman to six strokes of the cane and a RM 5,000 ($1,400) fine after she was caught drinking beer in a hotel in the Malaysian state of Pahang.

In March 2009, Malaysian religious authorities threatened to sue the Malaysian Bar, which represents 12,000 of the country’s lawyers, for using the word “Allah” on the Bar's website.

In November 2008, the Malaysian National Fatwa Council told Muslims to refrain from doing yoga because is it blasphemous. The condemnation of yoga followed upon the Council's condemnation of females who wear trousers. The Council said that girls who wear trousers are at risk of becoming sexually-active tomboys.

In 2008, religious authorities were seeking Ayah Pin, the leader of a banned, nonviolent religious group known as the Sky Kingdom, and one of his four wives for supporting "deviant" religious practices. On 3 March 2008, a Sharia Court sentenced Kamariah Ali, 57, who converted from Islam to the banned group, to two years imprisonment for apostasy.

On February 12, 2008, the Internal Security Ministry issued a directive to the Catholic Church to stop using the word "Allah" in its weekly publication, The Herald. On 16 February 2009, the Ministry revised its directive to permit the word "Allah" in Christian publications if each publication bore a notice which indicated the publication was not for Muslims.

In January 2008, officials from the Ministry of Internal Security seized Christian children's books from several bookshops. The books contained drawings representing Moses and Noah. The officials deemed the drawings "caricatures of prophets," and said the drawings were offensive to Muslim sensibilities. The Malaysian Council of Churches accused ministry officials of overstepping their authority by confiscating literature that was not meant for Muslims. The Ministry returned the books.

In August 2007, the government of Malaysia suspended for one month the operations of a daily Makkal Osai (in the Tamil language) for violating the Printing Presses and Publications Act 1984. On 21  August 2007, the daily had published a caricature of Jesus Christ clutching a cigarette and a can of beer.

On 23 January 2006, the National Fatwa Council, Malaysia's highest Islamic authority, banned Muslims from taking part in the activities associated with Black Metal music. Datuk Mustafa Abdul Rahman, the director-general of the Islamic Development Department, told a press conference on 27 January 2006, that Black Metal often led its followers to worship Satan, rebel, kill, and incite hatred. Nevertheless, the government favored counseling rather than a ban upon the musical genre.

On or about 23 May 2002, a French missionary was arrested on blasphemy charges after distributing a pamphlet about Quranic plagiary. Though he could have been sentenced to two to five years in jail for "acting in a manner which could lead to disharmony between Christians and Muslims," a judge ordered that he be deported.

In 2000, the Sharia High Court in the state of Kelantan sentenced four persons to three years in prison for disregarding a lower court's order to recant their deviant beliefs and "return to the true teachings of Islam." The High Court rejected the argument that Sharia has no jurisdiction over people who have ceased to be Muslims. In dismissing the appeal, the Court of Appeal ruled (in August 2002) that only the Sharia court has jurisdiction to determine whether a person has ceased to be a Muslim.

See also
 Apostasy in Islam
 Caning in Malaysia
 Education in Malaysia
 Freedom of religion in Malaysia
 Freedom of speech by country
 Islam in Malaysia
 Religion in Malaysia

References

External links
https://web.archive.org/web/20091015120701/http://www.caslon.com.au/blasphemyprofile11.htm

Malaysia
Malaysia
Malaysian constitutional law
Law about religion in Malaysia